The 2015 Liga Indonesia Premier Division season was the 20th edition of Liga Indonesia Premier Division and the seventh edition as a second-tier competition.

On November 3, 2014, PSSI announced that starting this season, teams are not allowed to use foreign players and only allowed to have a maximum of 30 players. It was planned to start the season in March 2015 but it was revised to start the season on February 19, 2015. The start of the season was again revised to start in mid-April. On April 20, 2015, it was confirmed that the season will start on April 26, 2015.

This season was officially discontinued by PSSI on May 2, 2015 due to a ban by Imam Nahrawi, Minister of Youth and Sports Affairs, against PSSI to run any football competition. Only one match was successfully played before the ban was put on place.

Format
This year the competition will divided into six groups containing tens teams, the top two teams from each group will qualify for the next round, meanwhile the five lowest team from each group will be relegated to Liga Nusantara next season, this is done to reduce participants to 32 clubs in the 2016 season.

Teams
Persiba Bantul, Persijap Jepara, Persita Tangerang and Persepam Madura Utama will participate this season, having been relegated from Indonesia Super League. Cilegon United and Persibat Batang are teams promoted from Liga Indonesia First Division. Laga FC, Persatu Tuban, Perssu Sumenep, PS Badung, Perserang Serang and Persibas Banyumas are teams promoted from Liga Nusantara.

Persiwa Wamena will still play in the Liga Indonesia Premier Division despite gaining promotion in the 2014 Liga Indonesia Premier Division, after they did not pass the verification process for the 2015 Indonesia Super League. Persik Kediri will also compete in the Liga Indonesia Premier Division, because they fail to pass the verification process.

On April 20, 2015, Persiwa Wamena and Persik Kediri decided to pull out from the competition, joining PSBS Biak and Persifa Fak-fak who failed the verification process.

Stadium and locations

First round 
This round will start on 26 April 2015 until 10 September 2015 with 55 teams competing.

Group 1

Group 2

Group 3

Group 4

Group 5

Group 6

See also 
 2015 Indonesia Super League
 2015 Liga Nusantara
 2015 Indonesia Super League U-21
 2015 Piala Indonesia

References

Second tier Indonesian football league seasons
Indonesian Premier Division seasons
2
Indonesia
Indonesia